Barnhill Quarry is a 3.1 hectare geological Site of Special Scientific Interest near Chipping Sodbury, South Gloucestershire, notified in 1966.

Sources
 English Nature citation sheet for the site (accessed 9 July 2006)

Sites of Special Scientific Interest in Avon
South Gloucestershire District
Sites of Special Scientific Interest notified in 1966
Quarries in Gloucestershire